Ubu, Nepal is a Village Development Committee in Okhaldhunga District in the Province No. 1 of mid-eastern Nepal. At the time of the 1991 Nepal census it had a population of 3075 residing in 604 individual households.

References

External links
UN map of the municipalities of Okhaldhunga District

Populated places in Okhaldhunga District